International Branch of Alexandria University is national, non-profit Egyptian university that is part of Alexandria University, The decision was issued to establish it by the Alexandria University Council on October 29, 2019. It is located in the universities area in the new Borg El Arab city at Alexandria Governorate on an area of about 350 acres. The university will focus entirely on international programs and colleges and will become the international extension of the University of Alexandria. Education at the university will be based on the system of special programs taught in a credit-hours method, and it is expected that the cost of establishing the branch will reach about five billion Egyptian pounds over ten years.

Faculties
 International Faculty of Medicine, is the first college currently established within the branch. The college consists of 2 educational buildings with a total value of about 400 million Egyptian pounds, and it is scheduled to open in 2023.

See also
 Egypt-Japan University of Science and Technology
 City of Scientific Research and Technological Applications

References

Alexandria University
Universities in Egypt
New Borg El Arab